Chundi Ramgha is a village which lies in Bhanu Municipality, Tanahun District, Nepal. Actually Chundi is the name of river (Chundi River), which flows through the lower lands of Ramgha base.

The first poet of Nepali language hence known as Aadikavi (early poet) Bhanubhakta Acharya was born in Chundi Ramgha. Nara Nath Acharya, who wrote the Authentic Biography of Bhanubhakta Acharya was also born and lived in this village.

References

Populated places in Tanahun District